What's Your Raashee? is the soundtrack album to the 2009 romantic comedy film of the same name. The soundtrack is composed by Sohail Sen and the lyrics are penned by Javed Akhtar. It was released by Sony Music on 9 September 2009 and upon release, the soundtrack received critical acclaim from music critics, who commended Sen's musicianship and vocal ability.

Development
There was a speculation that the soundtrack of What's Your Raashee? will be composed by the Academy Award winner, A. R. Rahman, but soon afterwards, director Ashutosh Gowariker announced that he would be hiring newcomer, Sohail Sen to compose the soundtrack of the movie. The track listing for the soundtrack took more than one and a half years to be finalised. The album consists of thirteen songs, which is made up of twelve songs for each zodiac sign representing the characters played by Priyanka Chopra, and one introductory song. Sen has lent his voice for nine out of the thirteen songs in addition to composing the soundtrack.

Track listing

Reception

Although the response to the feature film itself was negative, the soundtrack has been able to gain mainly positive reviews. The Song "Jao Na" was a chartbuster, and was popular among the audiences. Bollywood Hungama praises Sohail Sen and Javed Akhtar for their work and quoted the album as "interestingly done" and "an experience not to be missed". The album received an overall rating of four out of five stars. Ankit Ojha from Planet Bollywood called it "A Musical Extravaganza!". BBC Music said "Sen shows he can successfully compete with the best in Bollywood".

Album credits

Musicians
Sunil Daas – sitar
Bilshad Khan – sarangi
Kishore Singh – ravan hattha
Iqbal Warshi – taar shehnai
P.M.K. Naveen Kumar, K.Srinivasan, Parasnath – flute
Sumit Mitra – accordion
Pawan Rasaily, Ankur Mukherjee, Chintoo Singh, Tushar Parte – guitar
Rashid Khan – bulbul tarang
Gino Banks, Ankeet Bham – drums
Pratap Rath, Shadab Roshan – percussion
Ritu Raj – tenor sax
Joseph M. – trumpet
Nirmal Mukherjee, Suresh Soni, Pradeep Lad, Ram Prakash K, Raju Sardar, Aziz Khan, Yusuf Moh’d, Aslam Dafrani, Iqbal Langa, Anoop Shankar, Hafeez Ahmed Khan, Roshan Ali, Sanjeev Vyas, Sharafat Khan – rhythm
Pradeep Sen Gupta, Chandrakant L – mandolin
Cine Musician Association, Mumbai – strings

Production
Producer: Sohail Sen
Recording Engineers: R. Muralidhar, Aditya Modi, Shantanu Hudlikar, Abhishek Khandelwal, Rafiq Sen
Mixing: R. Muralidhar
Mastering: Shadab Rayeen, Aditya Modi
Additional Programming: Simaab Sen, Santosh Mulekar, Praful Keluskar, Shreeram Iyer
Music co-ordination: Ramanand Shetty, Sheshappa T. Poojari
Music Design & Production: Rajeev Bhatt
Rhythm Conduction: Sanjeev Sen

Credits adapted from the liner notes of What's Your Raashee?.

References

Hindi film soundtracks
2009 soundtrack albums